A Hill repair is an anti-acid reflux procedure.  It is similar to the Nissen fundoplication.  Though far less common owing to a greater degree of difficulty, studies indicate a similar rate of efficacy.  It is performed almost exclusively in the Pacific Northwest.

References 

Digestive system surgery